Thomas de Mowbray, 1st Duke of Norfolk, KG (22 March 136622 September 1399) was an English peer. As a result of his involvement in the power struggles which led up to the fall of King Richard II, he was banished and died in exile in Venice.

Background and youth
The Mowbrays were an old family in the English peerage, having been first raised to the baronage in 1295. Several advantageous marriages, combined with loyal service to the crown and rewards from it made them, by the late 14th century, a great political standing. Thomas was the son of John de Mowbray, 4th Baron Mowbray and his wife Elizabeth Segrave, the daughter and heiress of John Segrave, 4th Baron Segrave by his wife Margaret, Duchess of Norfolk, daughter and heiress of Thomas of Brotherton, 1st Earl of Norfolk,  the fifth son of King Edward I.

Thomas Mowbray was born in 1366; the precise date is unknown. He was probably named after the cult of St Thomas Becket, of which his mother was a follower. His elder brother John was their father's heir; he died in 1368. Four years later, they became the ward of their great-aunt, Blanche of Lancaster. John was created Earl of Nottingham on the coronation of King Richard II in 1377, but died in early 1383. Almost immediately—within a few days—the earldom was re-granted to Thomas, and even though he was still legally a minor, he was allowed seisin of his patrimony and the comital penny.

Political background
Richard II succeeded to the throne in 1377 on the death of his grandfather, Edward III, but his unpopularity had been growing since Richard's suppression of the Peasants' Revolt in 1381. He was increasingly criticised for his patronage of a few select royal favourites, to an extent that has been described as "lavish to the point of foolishness" by a biographer, historian Anthony Tuck. Parliament was also coming to the view that the King needed to rule as economically as possible, and they observed with displeasure the King's distribution of extravagant patronage to a limited circle, the greatest recipient of which was Michael de la Pole, Earl of Suffolk. Furthermore, the Hundred Years' War was going poorly for England. Several expeditions had left for France in the early years of Richard's reign to defend English territory, but they were almost all military and political failures.

As a second son, little is recorded of Mowbray's youth, although his background and status "virtually guaranteed him a place at court", says Saul. The King and Mowbray had probably been childhood friends, and was a royal favourite from at least 1382, when he was granted hunting rights in certain royal forests and was knighted. It was around this time that Bolingbroke began to fall out of favour with the King, with Mowbray supplanting him. Mowbray also married the ten-year-old Lady Elizabeth Lestrange, heiress of John, Lord Blakemere, whose marriage cost the King around £1000. Elizabeth died in 1383, not long after the wedding.

Career to 1390
Mowbray remained high in royal favour following the death of his wife, and he was elected to the Order of the Garter in October the same year, even though he was militarily unproven. The King granted him grace and favour rooms at the royal palaces of Eltham and Kings Langley. Reflecting his role as an important courtier, Mowbray accompanied Richard on his tour of East Anglia in 1383. His closeness to the King drew the opprobrium of the King's uncle, John of Gaunt, Duke of Lancaster—probably the most powerful man in the Kingdom after the King—upon him. Gaunt accused Mowbray, along with Robert, Earl of Oxford and William, Earl of Salisbury of plotting against the King. Gaunt himself was becoming increasingly unpopular and had withdrawn from the council. As a result, says the chronicler Thomas Walsingham, Mowbray, de Vere and Montacute plotted to kill the duke in February 1385. The King held jousts between the 13th and 14th of the month, and Gaunt's murder was to be committed on the 14th; it is possible that Richard did not disapprove, such had relations between him and his uncle broken down. Originally, this had been over foreign policy; Gaunt favoured a restoration of the war with France, while Richard was keen to invade Scotland Gaunt had also recently told Richard that he viewed the King's advisors as "unsavoury", and Mowbray and his friends deliberately exacerbated the two men's antagonism by proffering a series of accusations against the duke. Gaunt received a forewarning of the attack, however, and fled in the night.

On 30 June 1385—as the royal army was about to leave for Scotland—Mowbray received his great-grandfather's office of Marshal of England, although he could not have foreseen this eventuality as at the time the campaign was announced the marshalcy was possessed by the Earl of Kent. Mowbray led a force of 99 men-at-arms and 150 archers, serving with Gaunt in the vanguard. Mowbray helped draw up the King's ordinances for the campaign when the royal army reached Durham,{{refn|These ordinances still survive at the British Library, catalogued as MS Cotton Nero D. VI. 89r—90r.|group=note}} although by now, suggests Given-Wilson, Mowbray's relations with Richard "may have been cooling". Less than a year after his first wife's death, Mowbray married Elizabeth Fitzalan. Elizabeth was a daughter of Richard, Earl of Arundel, and, although the King attended their wedding and the week-long festivities accompanying it, it is unlikely that the marriage was popular with Richard. His second marriage must have been a turning point. Richard doubtless saw Arundel as a negative influence on Mowbray and feared the strengthening of the earl's position against him. Mowbray and Elizabeth had also wed without his permission, and so the King distrained Mowbray's estates until he had received the value of the license. Tuck argues, in fact, that "nor was the king's concern unfounded"; Mowbray had been increasingly isolated at court by the King's latest favourites, such as Oxford, and had moved into the circle of those who opposed the new royal intimates, perhaps seeing them as the best way to dispose of his rival. This circle also included not only Richard's father-in-law but his uncle, Thomas, Duke of Gloucester. In a sign that Mowbray was not completely out of favour, Elizabeth received her robes as a Lady of the Garter in 1386.

Both men had played an important role in parliament's attack on Richard's chancellor, Michael de la Pole, Earl of Suffolk at the Wonderful Parliament of 1386. The Wonderful Parliament had taken place against a backdrop of genuine fear of a French invasion—Walsingham described how Londoners, in his view, like "timid mice they scurried hither and thither—and Arundel had been appointed Admiral of England. In March the following year he, in turn, appointed Mowbray his deputy, and they took a fleet out of Margate and encountered a French-Flemish fleet almost immediately. The result was its crushing defeat. Between 50 and 100 ships French-Flemish ships were captured or destroyed. The King was unimpressed. When Arundel and Mowbray returned to court, Richard coolly claimed they had only defeated merchants, and Oxford turned his back on the earls.

Appellant

For most of the 1380s, Mowbray received what he doubtless considered his due from the King, in lands, offices and grants. But by 1387 he became increasingly estranged from Richard's court. The main reason for this was probably jealousy of de Vere. While he was wealthy enough not to have to rely on royal favour, as de Vere did, he expected the honour and dignity that his birth and status demanded. This he saw increasingly syphoned off to his rival. Although the Wonderful Parliament had set up a commission to effectively restrain the King, it failed so to do. Richard emasculated the commission by leaving London straight away, and not only ignored its deliberations but his own councils in the provinces. He also took legal advice from his judges who, unsurprisingly, found in his favour that those responsible for parliament's treatment of the King should be deemed traitors. In response, Mowbray joined Bolingbroke, Gloucester, Arundel and Warwick in appealing several of the King's friends, including Oxford, of treason, and raised an army at Hornsey, north of London. The Appellants' army engaged Oxford's at the Battle of Radcot Bridge, inflicting a crushing defeat on the royalists in December. Mowbray did not take part, as he was guarding the road back to the West Midlandsl at Moreton in Marsh, although he may have sent a portion of his retinue to the Appellant army.

Mowbray appears to have been responsible for dissuading Gloucester, Arundel and Warwick from marching to London and deposing the King. Indeed, he and Bolingbroke may have been a moderating influence on the others. Converseley, due to his position as Earl Marshal—one of the two heads of the Court of Chivalry—his presence with the Appellants enabled them to frame their offensive juridically rather than as a traditional noble rebellion. He was one of the group that attended Richard in the Tower of London—with arms linked—on 30 December and accused the King of treachery towards them. They also demanded Richard order the arrest of the appellees; Walsingham reports that he only agreed to do so on being threatened, once again, with deposition. The King attempted to divide Mowbray from his colleagues, asking him to stay behind when the others were ready to leave.  With the King now under their control, Mowbray and the Appellants called parliament for early 1388. This session became known as the Merciless Parliament on account of the vengeance it laid on the King's closest supporters. with Mowbray overseeing the executions with "the aid and authority of the mayor, sheriffs, and aldermen of London". Mowbray was to take the condemned to the Tower and "‘from there drag him through the city of London as far as the gallows at Tyburn, and there hang him by the neck".

Rapprochment with the King

For his part, there are signs that Mowbray was becoming dissatisfied with his comrades through the course of the parliament, which Tuck suggests was because Mowbray was "never as committed to the destruction of the court faction as Gloucester, Arundel, and Warwick". Given-Wilson suggests that including Mowbray by the Appellants broadened their base among the nobility, by virtue of his having had less acrimonious relations with the King, but also weakened them as a body by diluting their grievances. As indicated by Mowbray's dispute with Warwick over the Gower lordship, they were already "shot through with personal and political differences" as it was. Tuck suggests that, while Mowbray seems able to have stomached the convictions of the others, "the real rift occurred over the question of Sir Simon Burley's fate". Gloucester and Warwick accused him of exercising undue influence over Richard; Burley, the under-chamberlain, had been tutor to the King, who wanted to save him. Mowbray and Bolingbroke agreed, but to no avail, and in May 1388 Burley was hanged at Tyburn. Mowbray was loyal to the King and court.

Early indications of Mowbray's return to favour with the came in early 1389 when he had his estates restored to him and was pardoned for having married without the King's licence. In March he was appointed warden of the East March and castellan of Berwick Castle, receiving wages of £6,000 in peacetime and twice that in time of war. His appointment was not a success; he alienated the traditional lord of the north, Henry Percy, Earl of Northumberland, who retired to court. Mowbray held no lands in the north and had few contacts among the gentry, upon whom he needed to rely to raise his army. Mowbray's tenure in the East March was effectively disabled from the start; Mowbray's ineffectiveness to highlighted in June that year, when a Scottish incursion ravaged the north of England and, facing little opposition, went as far south as Tynemouth. Mowbray, the Westminster Chronicle reports, refused the Scottish offer of a pitched battle and retreated to Berwick Castle.

The King regained sole control of government around in May 1389, and Mowbray attended a royal council meeting in Clarendon Palace that September, demonstrating the gulf that existed by then between him and his ex-comrades. At another meeting the following month the King attempted to increase Mowbray's remuneration in March. The council, headed by William of Wykeham as chancellor, refused—"in the name and by the will of all the other lords of the council"—and Richard was forced to acquiesce, albeit , or "with an angry expression". Henry Percy had been recompensed for the loss of the wardenship with the captaincy of Calais; in 1391, he and Mowbray exchanged offices, returning Percy to the March and sending Mowbray to France.

Martial service

As a result of Mowbray's return to the court party, his undertaking of royal service for the King increased. He jousted before Richard's chamberlain at St Inglevert, near Boulogne, in April 1390, where he proved himself a champion against the French, who were led by the well-regarded knight, Jean de Boucicaut. Mowbray led a group of up to 60 English knights and esquires. The following month another joust was held at Smithfield, outside London. Mowbray's presence in the King's party was a part of Richard's policy of reconciling the appellants to his personal rule and, by extension, furthering his own power. Here, before the King, Mowbray defeated John Dunbar, Earl of Moray—who later died, says one chronicler, of his wounds—after six jousts with an unrebated lance. Froissart wrote how, at Smithfield "everyone exerted himself to the utmost to excel: many were unhorsed and more lost their helmets".

Mowbray joined the King on his campaign to Ireland in 1394. Richard's strategy was to plant his nobility across the country in direct confrontation with Gaelic kings in order to force them into submission. Mowbray occupied Carlow, of which he was granted the lordship. Mowbray led several raids against the King of Leinster, Art Macmurrough, and a royal letter to the council reported how he "had several fine encounters with the Irish". Mowbray burned nine villages, killing many, and captured around 8,000 head of cattle. On one occasion he nearly captured MacMurrough "and his wife in their beds". MacMurrough's escape left Mowbray "sorely vexed", and in revenge he had the house razed, as well as 14 surrounding villages. He then marched through the Blackstairs Mountains "which was all bog...no Englishman has commonly entered before". A number of enemies were captured. The leader was executed and his head sent to Richard.

Mowbray eventually secured MacMurrough's indenture of submission to Richard. During these negotiations, Mowbray possessed full  powers, and persuaded Macmurrough to evacuate Leinster for the English. His sub-chieftains followed. In the event neither macMurrough nor his armies left Leinster, and Mowbray was in no position to force them. His attempts to install English lordship in the province came to nothing, he returned to England in May 1395.

Royal service to 1398
On his return, Mowbray almost immediately became involved, with his comrades-in-arms from the Irish campaign Lord Scrope and the Earl of Rutland, in the negotiations over Richard's proposed marriage to Isabella, daughter of the French King, Charles VI. Mowbray made many trips to France, finally concluding negotiations in March 1396. The betrothal was made official in September, and Mowbray escorted the French King to Calais. Mowbray was also deputised by Richard to conduct secret negotiations with Philip, Duke of Burgundy and John, Duke of Berry. Given-Wilson suggests that the King "had considerable faith in Mowbray's diplomatic ability", since in May the next year Mowbray represented the crown at the Imperial Diet in Frankfurt. This had been called to debate an Anglo-French proposal on how to address the latest Papal Schism by forcing the resignation of the two partisan popes. Richard's faith in Mowbray is reflected in the numerous grants the earl received in this period. Tuck suggests that Mowbray could afford to spend an estimated 40% of his total income just on wages to retainers, which enabled him to build up a substantial affinity "that could rival that of most earls".

In 1397, at Warwick's expense, Mowbray received the lordship of Gower, which their two families had been quarrelling for possession of for most of the preceding century. Saul suggests that Mowbray relied on his friendship with the King to retrieve the grant, which had been in Beauchamp's hands since 1354. This was "doubly disastrous" for Warwick, comments Saul; not only was it the richest lordship he possessed—thus having a major impact on his income—but he was ordered to repay Mowbray the profits he had earned since 1361, amounting to around £5333 per annum. The atmosphere at court was tense. Richard may have felt threatened, suspecting that the Appellants would have another crack at him; this may have led him to get in there first. In July, the King settled all family accounts with the Appellants. He invited Arundel, Gloucester and Warwick to a feast—of Herodian infamy, reported Walsingham—at which they would be arrested. Only Warwick attended. All three were tried, separately, and convicted for treason in September. Warwick forfeit his titles and estates and was sentenced to life imprisonment. Arundel was beheaded; Mowbray, as Earl marshal, oversaw the sentence of his erstwhile comrade. Gloucester was exiled to Calais where he died in curious circumstances the same month. It was probably Mowbray's attempts to save Simon Burley's life years before that saved his in 1397.

Murder of Gloucester and elevation

Gloucester was secretly arrested on the night of 10–11 July 1397, and "bundled out of England to Calais". It was popularly speculated that the King personally ordered Gloucester's assassination, and it was later alleged—in the 1399 parliament—that Mowbray was likely instrumental, in his role of Captain of Calais. Rumours of Gloucester's death had been circulating since August, and Given-Wilson speculates that this may be a sign that Richard had ordered Mowbray to kill the duke then, but that the latter hesitated several weeks. Richard ordered William Rickhill, Justice of the King's Bench, to Calais, "in the company of our dearest kinsman Thomas, earl marshal and earl of Nottingham... and there that you do and perform each and everything which is enjoined on you by the aforesaid earl on our behalf". In the event they travelled separately. Rickhill left England on 7 September and was to receive Mowbray's instructions when they arrived. The writs he was in possession of, notes McVitty, "were deliberately left undated or were post-dated to fit a falsified timeline". When they met, Mpwbray's instructions were that Rickhill was to have a "colloqium... clearly and openly certified under his seal". Gloucester made his confession, in the presence of witnesses, on 8 September. The following day, when Rickhill requested another meeting with the Duke, Mowbray refused him. A few days later Mowbray was requested by parliament to bring Gloucester back to England and stand trial before it. Mowbray returned the writ replying, baldly, that he was unable to do so, because the duke was dead: "I held this duke in my custody in the lord king’s prison in the town of Calais, and there, in that same prison, he died". The historian Amanda McVitty suggests that "historians generally agree that by this point, Richard must have known that Gloucester was already dead".

On 29 September the same year, Mowbray received a formal royal pardon for his role as an Appellant. Further, "it is perhaps no coincidence", suggests the scholar Matthew Lewis, that at the same time Mowbray was elevated to Duke of Norfolk as part of Richard's re-establishment of his aristocracy known as the Duketti: "dukelings" or "little dukes". Given-Wilson has suggested that Mowbray's new title "cheapened the great titles at the crown's disposal", while Rowena Archer has argued that, although he may not have been related to the King by blood, "he had lineage and wealth to merit so high an honour". He also suggests that this does not necessarily indicate the true relationship between the two men. As an (albeit ex) appellant, Richard must have found it difficult to forget Mowbray's earlier treason, irrespective of his subsequent loyalty. For Mowbray's part, he was too experienced a political operator at the court not to realise this. To celebrate their return to the King's grace, Bolingbroke and Mowbray held a ceremonial requiem mass and feast, last which the King and Queen attended. The bones were displayed at the Carmelite church and was clearly intended to reflect personally on Mowbray also, increasing his political stature just as he had been elevated to the highest title in the land.

Quarrel with Bolingbroke
By late 1397 Richard was planning another expedition to Ireland, while in another repercussion from the Revenge Parliament, around the same time Mowbray quarrelled with Bolingbroke, now Duke of Hereford. Not only did this seriously disrupt the King's plans, but says Saul, it was also the event that "brought the royal house of cards come tumbling down". The historian Caroline Barron argues that "a certain amount of inter-aristocratic rivalry could work to the king’s advantage, but it was a dangerous game to play", and this one was to be fatal to Richard. The causes behind their dispute are no longer obvious, but Saul suggests that, although a "tangled story", Given-Wilson's explanation is probably as accurate as can now be discerned. He suggests that the issue was less with the personalities involved and more to do with broader disagreements regarding royal policy, which the King was unable to contain. The narrative of events only survives through Bolinbroke's later retelling. They had both been pardoned in December 1397 in the final session of the previous parliament. 

According to him, Bolingbroke met him on the London–Brentford road—they were both on their way to the Shrewsbury parliament—and Mowbray told him that the king was planning on having them both arrested and that the royal pardons they had received were valueless; Richard intended to "annul that record". Bolingbroke said he protested that the King would not commit such a breach of faith, to which Mowbray supposedly reminded him that Warwick, Arundel and Gloucester had also had pardons. The King in turn was backing their enemies at court, especially Roger Mortimer, Earl of March, the Duke of Surrey and the Earls of Wiltshire, Salisbury and Gloucester. Mowbray apparently urged Bolingbroke to turn against Surrey, Wiltshire and Gloucester, arguing that "even if they are unable to achieve their purpose at present, they will be intent on destroying us in our homes ten years hence". Mowbray, claimed Bolingbroke, told him that the King thought revenge a dish best served cold and could not be trusted to keep his word. In given-Wilson's words, "It was, [Mowbray] remarked, in the time-honoured manner of politicians sensing the knife at their back, a funny old world.{{ Mowbray was probably more concerned for his safety than Bolingbroke, as the latter had the support of John of Gaunt behind him. Mowbray did not.

The King heard of their encounter and made Bolingbroke repeat Mowbray's "many dishonest and slanderous words" at the Shrewsbury sitting of parliament. On 3 January 1398, Bolingbroke presented the King with a deed—"to the best of his memory"—of accusation. Mowbray was furious and denied everything. Parliament was unable to establish the rights or wrongs of the affair, and Richard set up a committee to do resolve it. Believing that Bolingbroke was doing his father's bidding, Mowbray lay an ambush for Gaunt in early 1398, although the Duke escaped to Shrewsbury. Mowbray now panicked, says Given-Wilson, and fled; hence why only Bolingbroke's narrative of events survives. Mowbray did not hang around long enough to provide his own. The King reacted immediately. Mowbray forfeited his office of Earl Marshal and an order went out for his arrest. Mowbray appeared before Richard at Oswestry in January 1398, having either surrendered or been arrested. Pending a full council hearing in April, he and Bolingbroke were imprisoned in Windsor Castle. Bolingbroke was promptly bailed by his father; Mowbray remained in prison. However, the lack of either supporting or disputing evidence for either party's claims made it a "he said, he said" situation, and as a result, Richard decided that it could only be settled with trial by combat, since both men refused to be reconciled. The day was set for 16 September 1398 in Coventry, with the delay being intended to allow cooler heads to prevail if possible. They did not, and the tourney took place as agreed. Both men were experienced and skilled jousters, and according to Adam of Usk,

At this point, the King intervened and stopped the combat. Usk avers this was because he saw that Mowbray was on the verge of losing, whereas the official chronicle says Richard was averse to two of his subjects injuring themselves or worse in the name of his justice. Another contemporary chronicler, the author of the  suggests that the fighting had hardly begun when the King stopped it. The scholar Amanda McVitty suggests that he saw the chance to rid himself of two ex-Appellants while appearing to be acting with chivalric magnanimity. Canon Allington-Smith suggests that, perhaps, "it was not in his interest that either of them should win". The Medievalist Anne Curry has argued that, in his office of Earl Marshal, Mowbray would usually have organised such a duel himself. Historians, she proposes, have not made enough of the fact that that this was not enough for Bolingbroke to restrain his attack.

Exile and death
Instead of fighting, the two men were exiled: Mowbray for life, Bolingbroke for 10 years. Usk suggests that Mowbray would at some point be welcomed back, when "being minded he might restore him". Given-Wilson suggests that even at this stage, Richard had foreseen the possibility of confiscating the two men's estates. The longer sentence on Mowbray was supposedly because, while the charge of treason had not been proven, he had failed to renounce the appellants severely enough, had misgoverned Calais to the endangerment of the country and had plotted against John of Gaunt. Mowbray was given a choice by Richard. Either he went on pilgrimage to Jerusalem, or to Germany, Bohemia or Hungary. Anywhere else was prohibited upon pain of death. He was banned from communicating with Bolingbroke during the latter's exile. This sentence could not be appealed nor could they request to return early, although he would receive £1000 per annum from his estates while abroad. His office of Earl Marshal was granted to Westmorland, while his heir was placed in the household of Richard's Queen as a page. Mowbray also set up a council to advise the young Thomas in his father's absence, which included some of his own experienced councillors such as Sir John St. John.

Mowbray sailed from Lowestoft to Dordrecht on 19 September 1398; over a thousand well-wishers saw him off from the quay. It was 2PM, and Mowbray was accompanied by around 30 people, including servants and retainers. A historian of the town has commented that, "If the authorities had chosen Lowestoft as the embarkation point in preference to Yarmouth because it was smaller and less well known, their hopes of keeping the event low-key seem not to have worked". These included eighty members of the Suffolk gentry, and they testified that, with a strong wind behind him—"" was recorded—he could easily make six league before sunset.

Margaret, Duchess of Norfolk did not die until March 1399, so keeping the great Brotherton estates out of Mowbray's hands, who by then was in disgrace and exile. Even though he had been granted letters of protection after the Coventry judgement allowing him to sue for the right to enter any new inheritance, these were cancelled the same day Richard announced he would confiscate Bolingbroke's Lancastrian inheritance. In what the scholar Douglas Biggs has called an act of either "malice or great folly", the King confiscated Mowbray's Brotherton inheritance also. It is likely that, when he left for Jerusalem, he had taken a crusading vow; hence Richard II's choices to him were deliberately presented him with the opportunity to save his honour.

In Venice, he arranged to purchase a ship from the Signoria, during which negotiations he is recorded in the senate records as "Magnificent Lord the Duke of Gilforth", or Guildford. The antiquarian Mary Margaret Newett commented that "it is not clear why he took this title or how long he bore it", although there are a number of Venetian documents extant from a few years later that refer to him again as Duke of Norfolk.

Mowbray died of the plague in Venice on 22 September 1399. He was buried in St Mark's Cathedral with an unusual funerary slab. The imagery includes the royal arms of England (per his office of Earl Marshal), the lion crest of his family, the White Hart of Richard II and the White Swan of Henry IV—although the latter, comments the historian David Marcombe had "its head curiously concealed beneath Mowbray’s helm". Had he died closer to home, he probably would have been buried in the family mausoleum at Axholme.

Legacy and aftermath
Chris Given-Wilson has argued that Mowbray's feud with Bolingbroke led directly to the latter's usurption of Richard's throne. Bolingbroke returned to England in early July 1399. He claimed that he had only returned to claim his Lancastrian inheritance, but with Richard in Ireland and facing no resistance as he marched south, eventually usurped the crown on 30 September 1399. Shortly afterwards, on 6 October 1399, the creation of Mowbray as Duke of Norfolk was annulled by Parliament, although his heir retained his other titles. Mowbray's executors were granted £1000 for the fulfilment of his will, payment of debts and burial in Venice. In 1532 Mowbray's descendent, Thomas Howard, Duke of Norfolk requested the return of Mowbray's bones from Venice, intending them to be reinterred with his ducal descendants.

Personality and assessment
Mowbray founded the Axholme Charterhouse in 1395 or 1396; he had been petitioning the papacy since at least 1389 for authority to do so. He bequeathed Axholme "a tun or two pipes Gascon wine" a year, along with other smaller donations to other houses. Also in 1396 he founded a Carthusian monastery at Epworth.

Contemporary chroniclers are near-universal in their condemnation of Mowbray, although those that have survived were all writing after Bolingbroke's seizure of the throne. The historian Nigel Saul has described Mowbray as being "driven by ambition and lust for power", and fickle in character. Barron suggests he was "an erratic and insecure man", while Given-Wilson says that "impetuous and mercurial Mowbray may have been", but he was not without principles.

Marriages and issue
Mowbray married firstly, after 20 February 1383, Elizabeth le Strange (c. 6 December 137323 August 1383), suo jure Lady Strange of Blackmere, daughter and heiress of John le Strange, 5th Baron Strange of Blackmere and Lady Isabel de Beauchamp, daughter of Thomas de Beauchamp, 11th Earl of Warwick, by whom he had no issue. Mowbray's second wife was Lady Elizabeth FitzAlan (c. 13728 July 1425), widow of Sir William Montagu, and daughter of Richard FitzAlan, 11th Earl of Arundel and Lady Elizabeth de Bohun, daughter of William de Bohun, 1st Earl of Northampton, by whom he had two sons and three daughters.

Mowbray's eldest son and his namesake, inherited the earldom of Nottingham but rebelled against Henry IV in 1405 and was beheaded at the age of 19. The younger Thomas had married Constance, daughter of John Holland, Duke of Exeter around 1400. 
Mowbray's second son, John, thus inherited his father's earldoms. John married Katherine Neville, daughter of the northern magnate Ralph, Earl of Westmorland in 1412, and for loyal service under Henry V, John was restored to the dukedom of Norfolk in 1425.

Mowbray's oldest daughter Elizabeth married Michael de la Pole, 3rd Earl of Suffolk by 1403. Michael was described by a contemporary chronicler as being "as strong, as active and as daring as any member of the court" of Henry V, and, dying at the Battle of Agincourt in 1415, was one of the few notable English deaths. Margaret, the second daughter, married twice. Firstly to Sir Robert Howard, by whom she was the mother of John Howard, 1st Duke of Norfolk. She was married by 1420; Robert Howard may have been a retainer of the 2nd Duke of Norfolk and certainly fought with him in France. Her second marriage was to Sir John Grey of Ruthin, Denbighshire, an old friend of the Mowbrays. She died in 1459. The youngest daughter Isabel also married twice. Her first husband was Sir Henry Ferrers, son of William, Baron Ferrers of Groby; Henry died in 1425. She married secondly James Berkeley, 1st Baron Berkeley.

Estates
The patrimony that Mowbray inherited was substantial, predominantly based around East Anglia, and focused on the family's ancient holdings in Leicestershire, Lincolnshire and Yorkshire. These included the important manors of Melton Mowbray and their  of Axholme. His mother's Segrave inheritance augmented these estates, bringing him manors in Huntingdonshire, Norfolk, Sussex, Warwickshire and Wiltshire. His second wife—whose father, the Earl of Arundel was one of the wealthiest men in the country—brought him further estates in Norfolk, as well as more in Buckinghamshire and Essex. His landed income was in the region of £1,475 per annum. Given-Wilson calls this "a sizeable patrimony, but not one which would have put Mowbray in the first rank of English earls". However, this figure does not include the various gifts of valuables or grants of office and land he received from the King. Further, on the death of his grandmother, Countess Margaret, he would have expected to gain another major power base in East Anglia, particularly centred on Framlingham Castle. There was also a swathe of land across Yorkshire, stretching through Hovingham, Thirsk and Nidderdale. Combined with her estates on the Welsh Marches, around Chepstow, and other English counties, these have been adjudged to be worth approximately another £3000 annually. Saul has estimated his annual income at around £2,000 per annum.

Cultural representations

Tudor
As Thomas Mowbray, his quarrel with Bolingbroke and subsequent banishment are depicted in the opening scene of Shakespeare's Richard II. Mowbray is charged not only with Gloucester's murder but also with embezzling money intended to pay for the Calais garrison. The King promises that "frowning brow to brow, ourselves will hear / The accuser and the accused freely speak", although Mowbray professes himself unable to speak as freely as he wished due to the King's blood links with Bolingbroke. Mowbray's fears are unfounded: Richard describes Bolingbroke's charges as based on "ancient malice", and Mowbray is goaded into making his challenge for trial by combat, presumably so the King cannot find in his favour.  Mowbray, understanding he is a pawn in the King's plans, prophetically replies to Richard's "Lions make leopards tame" with the retort, "Yea, but not change his spots". Bolingbroke's accusations, argues Dr. Imke Lichterfeld, "are grave indeed", and range from the embezzlement of 8,000 nobles, to the death of Gloucester and treason: three crimes each worse than the last.  

His death in exile is announced later in the play by the Bishop of Carlisle. Mowbray is also mentioned in Henry IV, Part II, as having once employed the now-dissolute Falstaff as a page. The implication in that scene, set around 1405, is that Mowbray represents an extinct generation of great warriors, particularly as he is the last Englishman to have died on a crusade in the Shakespearean canon. When Shakespeare was writing, deposition was a politically sensitive subject, as, like Richard, Elizabeth I was also childless and increasingly paranoid of dynastic threats from her nobility. Shakespeare uses the exiling of Mowbray and Bolingbroke to represent the exiling of Catholic recusants during her later reign; and, suggests scholar Alfred Thomas, "would thus have resonated with those Elizabethans who had been forced to repudiate their native English tongue as they assumed a life of exile in Catholic Europe". Further forcing comparison with Elizabeth, Mowbray outright rejects his sovereign's "women's war" of words.

Mowbray appears in Baldwin and George Ferrers's A Mirror for Magistrates, from the mid-16th century. He is described as "the chief worker in the duke [of Gloucester]'s destruction", this is because Baldwin and Ferrers follows Robert Fabyan's view that by revealing Gloucester's plot against the King, Mowbray thereby sealed the Duke's fate, rather than because he was in Calais himself. They also suggest that Mowbray was perhaps the least committed of the Appellants in 1386. Mowbray is also the subject of a ballad by the late Tudor poet Thomas Deloney, "A Song of the Banishment of Two Dukes, Hereford and Norfolke". Deloney is faithful to the chronicles he follows, vilifying Mowbray—who is called "most untrue" to the King—and emphasising Bolingbroke's wisdom and righteousness and his God-given claim to the throne. Mowbray is blamed for the King's troubles:

Modern
Mowbray has been a major role in most adaptions of Shakespeare's Richard II, and only a few can be mentioned here. As Duke of Norfolk, he was portrayed by Noel Johnson in the BBC's fifteen-part serial adaptation of Shakespeare's history plays, An Age of Kings in 1960. Ian McKellen, in an early role, took the play on a provincial tour with the Prospect Theatre Company, with Stephen Greif as Mowbray, in 1960; he is last seen visiting Gloucester, with guards, carrying a mattress, reflecting the contemporary rumour of his suffocation. 1973 saw John Barton's Stratford-upon-Avon production, with Denis Holmes to Richard Pasco's King, in which Mowbray and Bolingbroke fought each other on massive hobby horses. Barton's production transferred to the Aldwych Theatre the following year. Five years later, David Giles production saw Richard Owens as Mowbray in the BBC's BBC Television Shakespeare, the entire canon transmitted over a period of seven years. Derek Jacobi led, and Gilles focussed on the ambiguity of the King's relationship with Mowbray, who had been his friend and loyal servant but could not yet trust again.

One of the first plays put on by the newly formed English Shakespeare Company, Mowbray was played by Michael Cronin between 1987 and 1988 to Michael Pennington's Richard. Indeed, it had been the RSC's failure to cast Pennington as Richard the previous year—taken by Jeremy Irons with Richard Moore as the Duke—that led to the formation of the breakaway group. Moore played Mowbray as an artisan-type, rather than a military man, with bright green clothes and a clumsy gait. David Lyon played to David Threlfall's Bolingbroke in Deborah Warner's 1995 production at the National Theatre's Cottesloe. This production was notable for the casting of Fiona Shaw as King Richard. Lyon reprised his role when Warner adapted her production for television two years later. Critic Michael Hattaway noted that, by then, "the uninformed resentment at the take-over of one of Shakespeare's greatest roles by a woman had been quelled by the excellence and intelligence of Shaw's performance".

In 2000, Steven Pimlott directed Patrick Troughton as Bolingbroke to Samuel West's Richard, with Paul Greenwood playing what critic Rhoda Koenig described as a "quietly intense, harshly whispering" Mowbray. Norfolk. He was played by James Purefoy in the BBC2 series The Hollow Crown, a 2012 television film adaptation of Shakespeare's Henriad, while the following year David Tennant took the leading role in Gregory Doran's RSC production, against Antony Byrne's Mowbray.

While Mowbray's purported murder of Gloucester takes place before Shakespeare's narrative begins, Mowbray does not appear in the play named after his victim, Thomas of Woodstock.

Notes

Citations

Works

 
 
 
 
 
 
 
 
 
 
 
 
 
 
  
 
 
 
 
 
 
 
 
 
 
 
 
 
 
 
 
 
 

 
 
 
 
 
 
 
 
 
 
 
 
 
 
 
 
 
 
 
 
 
 
 
 
 
 
 
 
 
 
 
 
 
 
 
 
 
 
 
 
 
 
 
 
 
 
 
 
 
 
 
 
 
 
 
 
 
 
 
 
 
 

 
 
 
 
 
 
 
 
 
 
 
 
 
 
 
 

 

1366 births
1399 deaths
14th-century deaths from plague (disease)
14th-century English people
Barons Mowbray
07
101
Earls Marshal
3rd Earl of Norfolk
21
Knights of the Garter
Male Shakespearean characters
Thomas